Elections to Londonderry Borough Council were held in 1964. Albert Anderson continued as Mayor.

Results
No seats were contested, and twelve Unionists and eight Nationalists were returned unopposed.

Estimates of political affiliation of the electorate
The following estimates of the political affiliation of the electorate were published by The Campaign for Social Justice in Northern Ireland in 1965. It divides the electorate into Unionists and Nationalists.

Unionists - 12 seats - 9,235 voters - 39.2 %

Nationalists - 8 seats - 14,325 voters - 60.8 %

Total - 20 seats - 23,560 voters

However, when all of the wards were contested in the next election in 1967, the Ulster Unionist Party won 32.2% of the vote, the Nationalist Party (Northern Ireland) won 33.9% of the vote and the Northern Ireland Labour Party won 31.9% of the vote.

Ward Estimates

North Ward

8 Councillors

Unionists - 4,355 voters
  
Nationalists - 2,356 voters

South Ward

8 Councillors

Nationalists - 10,130 voters
 
Unionists - 1,260 voters

Waterside Ward

4 Councillors

Unionists - 3,620 voters
 
Nationalists - 1,839 voters

References

Derry City Council elections
Londonderry
20th century in Derry (city)